Seven Lakes State Park is a public recreation area covering  one mile northwest of Holly in Holly Township, Oakland County, Michigan. The state park's  of water are found in six named lakes that include 170-acre Big Seven Lake, Little Seven Lake, and 44-acre Dickinson Lake.

History
The park's roots lie in a failed development scheme. In 1967, private interests built a dam on Swartz Creek in the Flint River watershed to create one large lake, Decoup Lake, from seven small lakes. When the developers gave up their efforts, the state purchased the site in 1969, naming it Seven Lakes State Park and its largest body of water Big Seven Lake. The park opened in 1977; a campground on Sand Lake was opened in 1992.

Activities and amenities
Big Seven Lake offers fishing for largemouth and smallmouth bass, northern pike, walleye, yellow perch, black crappie, and channel catfish. Recreational facilities in the park include campsites, swimming beaches, picnic areas, boat launches, trails for hiking and mountain biking, and hunting areas.

References

External links
Seven Lakes State Park Michigan Department of Natural Resources
Seven Lakes State Park Map Michigan Department of Natural Resources

State parks of Michigan
Protected areas of Oakland County, Michigan
Protected areas established in 1971
1971 establishments in Michigan
IUCN Category III